The Virginia–Wise Highland Cavaliers football program is a college football team that represents University of Virginia's College at Wise in the NCAA Division II Mountain East Conference.  The team has had 3 head coaches since its first recorded football game in 1991. The current coach is Dane Damron who first took the position for the 2016 season.

Key

Coaches

Notes

References

Virginia-Wise Highland Cavaliers

Virginia sports-related lists